Margaret Field (née Morlan; May 10, 1922 – November 6, 2011) was an American film actress usually billed as Maggie Mahoney after her marriage to actor Jock Mahoney. The mother of actress Sally Field, she was best known for her work in two science-fiction films, The Man from Planet X (1951) and Captive Women (1952) and played dozens of roles in various television series.

Early years
Field was born in Houston, Texas, the daughter of Joy Beatrice (née Bickeley) and Wallace Miller Morlan. Late in the 1930s, her family and she moved to Pasadena, California.

Career 
Field was discovered at the Pasadena Playhouse by talent scout Milton Lewis for Paramount Pictures. Following a successful screen test, she was offered an 18-month contract. She then attended Pasadena Junior College, studying voice training and acting, while acting in films. Early in her career, she acted in a series of Musical Parade short films for Paramount and had small roles in 26 full-length films from 1946 to 1953.

She appeared, often more than once, in television series, among which were two roles as defendants on the CBS drama series Perry Mason. In 1959, she played title character Eva Martell in "The Case of the Borrowed Brunette". In 1960, she played Linda Osborne in "The Case of the Nine Dolls". Other television appearances included a 1950 episode of The Lone Ranger entitled "Greed for Gold", Wagon Train, Bonanza, The Virginian, The Range Rider, Yancy Derringer starring her husband Jock Mahoney, To Rome With Love starring John Forsythe, Lawman starring Barry Sullivan and Clu Gulager, Westinghouse Desilu Playhouse, and the 1963 Twilight Zone episode "The New Exhibit", among many others. She also appeared in the science-fiction films Captive Women and The Man from Planet X. In February 1956, Field co-starred with her husband Jock Mahoney in the Death Valley Days episode "Swamper Ike".

Personal life 
In 1942, Field married Richard Dryden Field, an Army officer, and had two children by him: television and film actress Sally Field and physicist Richard D. Field. 

On January 21, 1952, Field married actor Jock Mahoney in Tijuana, Mexico, thereafter billed in her acting work as "Maggie Mahoney". Together they had a daughter, Princess, a director of television shows, such as ER and Shameless. Field and Mahoney divorced in June 1968. Around 1968, when her elder daughter Sally turned 22, Field virtually ended her acting career to focus on her family.

Death 
Field, aged 89, died of cancer at her home in Malibu, California, on November 6, 2011, which was her daughter Sally Field's 65th birthday.

Filmography

Selected television

References

External links
 

1922 births
2011 deaths
Actresses from Texas
American film actresses
American television actresses
Deaths from cancer in California
People from Houston
21st-century American women